Henry Youl (born 12 October 1995) is an Australian representative rower. He has represented at underage and senior World Championships and won a bronze medal at the 2022 World Championships.

Club and state rowing
Youl was raised in Tasmania. His Australian senior club rowing has been from the Tamar Rowing Club in Launceston and then following his selection to national squads, from the Sydney University Boat Club.

International representative rowing
Youl made his Australian representative debut as stroke of the coxless four at the 2016 U23 World Rowing Championships in Rotterdam. He led that crew to a bronze medal win.  The following year Youl again stroked the Australian U23 coxless four at the U23 World Championships in Plovdiv. They finished overall fifth. 

In March 2022 Youl was selected in the Australian training team to prepare for the 2022 international season and the 2022 World Rowing Championships.  He rowed in the Australian men's eight to silver medal placings at both of the World Rowing Cups in 2022. At the 2022 World Rowing Championships at Racize, Youl rowed in the three seat of the eight. The eight won through their repechage to make the A final where they raced to a third place and a World Championship bronze medal.

References

External links

1995 births
Living people
Australian male rowers
World Rowing Championships medalists for Australia
21st-century Australian people